Sergio Mora Sánchez (born 30 August 1979) is a Spanish former professional footballer who played as a midfielder, currently a manager.

He amassed Segunda División totals of 223 matches and 11 goals over eight seasons, in representation of Hércules, Alcorcón, Alavés, UCAM Murcia and Getafe. In La Liga, he totalled 47 appearances for the latter club and Rayo Vallecano.

Playing career
Mora was born in Torrejón de Ardoz, Madrid. A product of hometown club Rayo Vallecano's youth ranks, he appeared in 21 games for its first team during 2002–03's La Liga, in an eventual relegation. His debut in the competition came on 6 October 2002, in a 2–2 home draw against Villarreal CF.

Subsequently, competing mainly in Segunda División B, Mora went on to represent CF Gandía, Getafe CF (both on loan), Hércules CF, Benidorm CF, CD Alcoyano and AD Alcorcón, helping the latter promote to Segunda División for the first time ever in 2010. He scored his first professional goal on 11 September of that year, the last in a 4–1 away loss to UD Las Palmas. He was a regular at the Estadio Municipal de Santo Domingo the following five seasons, only appearing in less than 20 matches in 2014–15.

On 4 July 2015, at the age of 35, Mora signed with fellow league team Deportivo Alavés. He was an undisputed starter during his tenure, as they returned to the top flight after ten years.

Mora joined UCAM Murcia CF also in the second tier on 13 July 2016, after agreeing to a one-year contract. On 22 December, after featuring rarely, he moved to Getafe of the same league.

On 20 August 2017, after having taken the field a 0–0 away draw against Athletic Bilbao, Mora became the first player of Geta to appear in all three divisions for the club. One year later, he announced his retirement.

Coaching career
Mora was appointed assistant manager to José Bordalás at Getafe in the summer of 2019. On 8 July 2021, he returned to Hércules as head coach.

Managerial statistics

Honours
Alavés
Segunda División: 2015–16

References

External links

1979 births
Living people
Spanish footballers
Footballers from Madrid
Association football midfielders
La Liga players
Segunda División players
Segunda División B players
Tercera División players
Rayo Vallecano B players
CF Gandía players
Getafe CF footballers
Rayo Vallecano players
Hércules CF players
Benidorm CF footballers
CD Alcoyano footballers
AD Alcorcón footballers
Deportivo Alavés players
UCAM Murcia CF players
Spanish football managers
Segunda Federación managers
Hércules CF managers